Brian Daniel Miner (born March 27, 1981) is an American comedian and satirist. He is known for his co-creation of the live sketch comedy series The Crippling Thoughts of Victor Bonesteel along with fellow writer and comedian Bryan Finnigan  .

Presidential Campaign
In July 2007, Miner launched a satirical campaign for President of the United States as a means of drawing attention to the 2008 election and encouraging people to vote . In his campaign, Miner plays the role of a naive and dangerously underqualified candidate.

References
1. http://www.theorion.com

2. http://www.newsreview.com

3. http://www.brianminer2008.com

External links
https://web.archive.org/web/20110208002302/http://brianminer2008.com/

American male comedians
21st-century American comedians
Living people
1981 births